Baie-du-Febvre is a municipality in the Nicolet-Yamaska Regional County Municipality of Quebec, Canada. The population as of the Canada 2021 Census was 961. The municipality lies on the south shore of Lac Saint-Pierre, a section of the Saint Lawrence River.

Demographics

Population
Population trend:

Language
Mother tongue language (2006)

Economy
Baie-du-Febvre has its own independent telephone company, the Corporation de Téléphone de la Baie.

Attractions

Baie-du-Febvre, located on the southern shore of Lac Saint-Pierre (a UNESCO biosphere reserve), is well known as a haven for migrating snow geese.  Many birdwatching enthusiasts congregate there in spring and fall to observe them.  The town takes great pride in this aspect of its natural heritage, and has established an interpretation centre to teach visitors about the geese, their migration and the local biosphere.  Apart from a protected area close to the river, Limited hunting of snow geese is permitted.

See also
List of municipalities in Quebec
Lorenzo de Nevers

References

External links

Baie-du-Febvre official web site
Baie-du-febvre Interpretation Centre (in French)
Corporation de Téléphone de la Baie

Municipalities in Quebec
Incorporated places in Centre-du-Québec
Quebec populated places on the Saint Lawrence River
Nicolet-Yamaska Regional County Municipality